Rioja District is located in Rioja Province, Peru.

Districts of the San Martín Region